(born January 30, 1991) is a Japanese professional wrestler currently signed to World Wonder Ring Stardom promotion. Tora is a two-time Artist of Stardom Champion as well as one-time Goddess of Stardom Champion.

Professional wrestling career

World Wonder Ring Stardom

J.A.N. (2016–2018) 
On October 30, 2016, Tora made her professional wrestling debut where she teamed with Arisu Nanase as the two faced Azumi and Kaori Yoneyama in a losing effort. In 2017, Tora joined "Team Jungle", a group that involved the likes of Hiroyo Matsumoto, Jungle Kyona and Yoneyama. The group was later named "J.A.N.", an acronym for Jungle Assault Nation. On May 21, 2017, Tora received her first title match where she teamed with Kyona and Mayu Iwatani as they challenged Hiromi Mimura, Kairi Hojo and Konami for the Artist of Stardom Championship, but were unsuccessful.

Oedo Tai (2018–present) 
On May 27, 2018, Tora, alongside Kyona and Yoneyama, defeated  Oedo Tai (Hana Kimura, Hazuki and Kagetsu) to win the vacant Artist of Stardom Championship. The trio held the title until September 30, when they lost the title to Stars (Iwatani, Saki Kashima and Tam Nakano) during the afternoon show. On the evening show on the same day, Tora, alongside Kyona defeated Iwatani and Kashima to win the Goddess of Stardom Championship. Kyona and Tora held the title until November 23, when they lost the title to Queen's Quest (Momo Watanabe and Utami Hayashishita). On December 16, Tora challenged Watanabe for the Wonder of Stardom Championship during the main event on the sixth day of Goddesses of Stars show, but was unsuccessful.

On April 14, 2019, during the second annual draft, Tora was drafted to Oedo Tai after Kyona lost a five-way match, causing J.A.N. to disbanded. With Tora arrival to Oedo Tai, Tora embraced her villainous side. Tora became the leader of Oedo Tai with the former leader Kagetsu retiring. On March 24, 2020, Tora competed in the annual Cinderella Tournament and succeeded to advance to the finals where she was defeated by Giulia. On October 3, Tora, alongside Kashima, faced Tokyo Cyber Squad (Konami and Kyona) as Oedo Tai's representatives in a No Disqualification match as the losing team must disband their unit. Kashima and Tora won, forcing Tokyo Cyber Squad to disband as Konami turned on Kyona to join Oedo Tai. On November 14, Tora, alongside Bea Priestley and Kashima, defeated Donna Del Mondo (Giulia, Maika and Syuri) to win the Artist of Stardom Championship. On December 16, Tora, alongside Kashima and Priestley, lost the Artist of Stardom Championship to Cosmic Angels (Mina Shirakawa, Nakano and Unagi Sayaka).

On January 17, 2021, at Stardom 10th Anniversary Show, Tora challenged Giulia for the Wonder of Stardom Championship in a no disqualification match, but was unsuccessful. On July 7, Tora challenged Hayashishita for the World of Stardom Championship during the main event of Yokohama Dream Cinderella 2021 in Summer, however, the match was stopped by the referee after Tora suffered an injury, which was later confirmed to be a torn ACL.

Championships and accomplishments 
 World Wonder Ring Stardom
 Artist of Stardom Championship (2 times) – with Bea Priestley and Saki Kashima (1), and Jungle Kyona and Kaori Yoneyama (1)
 Goddess of Stardom Championship (1 time) – with Jungle Kyona
 Stardom Year-End Award (2 times)
 Best Unit Award (2021) 
 Fighting Spirit Award (2018)

References

External links 
 World Wonder Ring Stardom profile 
 

1991 births
Living people
Sportspeople from Kanagawa Prefecture
Japanese female professional wrestlers
21st-century professional wrestlers
Goddess of Stardom Champions